Neunkirchen is a Kreis (district) in the middle of the Saarland, Germany. Neighboring districts are Sankt Wendel, Kusel, Saarpfalz, Saarbrücken, and Saarlouis.

History
In 1814, the district Ottweiler was created; however, its history can be traced back to 1545 when it was created as Herrschaft Ottweiler, later Amt and Oberamt Ottweiler, and during the Napoleonic times as Kanton Ottweiler. Two years after its creation, it was reorganized in 1816 by order of the Congress of Vienna. In 1866, an attempt to move the district capital to Neunkirchen failed. In 1974, the districts were reorganized, the biggest change however was the change of the capital and thus the name to Neunkirchen. Some parts of the administration remained in Ottweiler.

Geography
The entire district is located in the industrial area, which is centered in Saarbrücken. It is situated on either bank of the Blies, a major tributary of the Saar River.

Coat of arms
The top part of the coat of arms show the lion of Nassau, as the area was ruled by a branch of the house of Nassau (Nassau-Saarbrücken, later Nassau-Ottweiler). In the bottom part it shows the main symbols of the two biggest cities in the district, the rose of Ottweiler and the wheel of Neunkirchen.

Towns and municipalities

References

External links

 

 
Districts of the Saarland